A  is an item of traditional clothing commonly worn since centuries ago among the Mongols, Turkic, and Tungusic peoples and can be made from cotton, silk, wool, or brocade.

The  is still commonly worn by both men and women outside major towns, especially by herders. In urban areas, s are mostly only worn by elderly people, or on festive occasions. The  appears similar to a caftan or an old European folded tunic. s typically reach to below the wearer's knees and fan out at the bottom and are commonly blue, olive, or burgundy, though there are s in a variety of other colors.

Description 
The  looks like a large overcoat when not worn. Instead of buttoning together in the middle, the sides are pulled against the wearer's body, the right flap close to the body with the left covering. On the right side of the wearer are typically 5 or 6 clasps to hold the top flap in place. There is one clasp below the armpit, three at the shoulder, and either one or two at the neckline.

A  is traditionally worn with a large sash, usually made of silk or leather belts with large, ornate buckles have become more common in the modern era. The area between the flaps and above the belt creates a large pocket in which the wearer can store objects; Mongolian men will occasionally even carry a silver bowl or cup, or even a snuff box in their . Though there is no major difference in material or outline between male and female s, females tend to wear the "pocket" closer (that is, women often prefer a more snug-fitting deel), while males' may have both larger pockets, looser fit, and wider sleeves.

In Mongolia, the usage of the word  has been extended to cover other long winter coats as well.

Types 
 design varies to a certain degree among cultures and ethnic groups, and has varied across time periods. There are even distinct variations among different Mongol tribes mostly on the design of the upper chest opening edges. For instance, the Khalkha Mongol  opening edges are round, while a Buryat 's is square. It can also vary among other tribes such as Chakhar, Torguud, and Uzemchin. s are designed for different occasions and environments. The design also varies due to function. There are s for ceremonies like weddings and holidays and s for daily wear. s for special occasions have their outer layer made of silk while the common deels are usually made of wool, cotton and other relatively inexpensive materials.

References

External links 
 
 "Mongolia Today" article

Mongolian culture
Folk costumes